Lich King is an American thrash metal band formed in 2004 in Amherst, Massachusetts.

History 
Lich King was formed in 2004 as a solo project by Tom Martin.

The band has cited Exodus, Slayer, S.O.D. and Vio-lence as influences. They describe themselves as an old-school thrash band, stating that the thrash metal sound was perfected in the 1980s and that is what they strive to recreate.

Members 

Current members
 Tom Martin – vocals (2004–2017), songwriting (2004–present)
 Brian Westbrook – drums, percussion, songwriting (2009–present)
 Joe Nickerson – bass (2009–2010), rhythm guitar (2011–present)
 Nick Timney – bass (2013–2014), rhythm guitar (2014–2015), lead guitar (2015–present)
 Mike Dreher – bass (2015–present)
 Zachary Smith – vocals (2017–present)

Former members
 Erick Herrera – guitar (2009–2010)
 Kevin Taylor – guitar (2009–2010)
 Dave Hughes – bass (2011–2013)
 Rob Pellegri – guitar (2011–2015)
 Ryan Taylor – live vocals (2015–2017)

Timeline

Discography

Studio albums 
 Necromantic Maelstrom (2007)
 Toxic Zombie Onslaught (2008)
 World Gone Dead (2010)
 Super Retro Thrash (2011)
 Born of the Bomb (2012)
 The Omniclasm (2017)

Demos 
 Necromantic Maelstrom (2006)

Extended plays 
 Do-Over (2014)

References

External links 
 

American thrash metal musical groups
Musical groups from Massachusetts